Too Many Times is the sixth studio album by American country music artist Earl Thomas Conley. It was released on September 18, 1986, via RCA Records. The album includes the singles "Too Many Times", his duet with Anita Pointer, "I Can't Win for Losin' You", "That Was a Close One" and "Right from the Start".

Track listing

Chart performance

References

1986 albums
Earl Thomas Conley albums
Albums produced by Mark Wright (record producer)
RCA Records albums